Constantine IV (650 – 10 July 685), called the Younger and sometimes incorrectly the Bearded out of confusion with his father, was Byzantine emperor from 668 to 685. His reign saw the first serious check to nearly 50 years of uninterrupted Islamic expansion, most notably when he successfully defended Constantinople from the Arabs. His calling of the Sixth Ecumenical Council saw the end of the monothelitism controversy in the Byzantine Empire; for this, he is venerated as a saint in the Eastern Orthodox Church, with his feast day on September 3.

Early career
The eldest son of Constans II and Fausta, daughter of patrician Valentinus, Constantine IV had been named a co-emperor with his father in 654, almost certainly in Easter (13 April).. His year of birth is unknown, but it's often given as  650. He became emperor in September 668, when news arrived at Constantinople that Constans II had been assassinated in Sicily.

The first task before the new Emperor was the suppression of the military revolt in Sicily under Mezezius which had led to his father's death. Within seven months of his accession, Constantine IV had dealt with the insurgency with the support of Pope Vitalian, but this success was overshadowed by troubles in the east.

As early as 668 the Caliph Muawiyah I received an invitation from Saborios, the commander of the troops in Armenia, to help overthrow the Emperor at Constantinople. He sent an army under his son Yazid against the Byzantine Empire. Yazid reached Chalcedon and took the important Byzantine center Amorion. While the city was quickly recovered, the Arabs next attacked Carthage and Sicily in 669. In 670 the Arabs captured Cyzicus and set up a base from which to launch further attacks into the heart of the Empire. Their fleet captured Smyrna and other coastal cities in 672. Finally, in 672, the Arabs sent a large fleet to attack Constantinople by sea. While Constantine was distracted by this, the Slavs laid siege to Thessalonica.

The Siege of Constantinople (674–678)

Commencing in 674, the Arabs launched the long-awaited siege of Constantinople.  The great fleet that had been assembled set sail under the command of Abdul-Rahman ibn Abi Bakr before the end of the year; during the winter months some of the ships anchored at Smyrna, the rest off the coast of Cilicia.  Additional squadrons reinforced the forces of Abd ar-Rahman before they proceeded to the Hellespont, into which they sailed in about April 674. From April to September 674 the fleet lay moored from the promontory of Hebdomon, on the Propontis, as far as the promontory of Kyklobion, near the Golden Gate, and throughout those months continued to engage with the Byzantine fleet which defended the harbour from morning to evening.

Knowing that it was only a matter of time before Constantinople was under siege, Constantine had ensured that the city was well provisioned.  He also constructed a large number of fireships and fast-sailing boats provided with tubes or siphons for squirting fire.  This is the first known use of Greek fire in combat, which was one of the key advantages that the Byzantines possessed.  In September, the Arabs, having failed in their attempts to take the city, sailed to Cyzicus, which they made their winter quarters.  Over the following five years, the Arabs returned each spring to continue the siege of Constantinople, but with the same results. The city survived, and finally in 678 the Arabs were forced to raise the siege.  The Arabs withdrew and were almost simultaneously defeated on land in Lycia in Anatolia. This unexpected reverse forced Muawiyah I to seek a truce with Constantine.  The terms of the concluded truce required the Arabs to evacuate the islands they had seized in the Aegean, and for the Byzantines to pay an annual tribute to the Caliphate consisting of fifty slaves, fifty horses, and 300,000 nomismata.  The raising of the siege allowed Constantine to go to the relief of Thessalonica, still under siege from the Sclaveni.

Later reign

With the temporary passing of the Arab threat, Constantine turned his attention to the Church, which was torn between Monothelitism and Orthodoxy. In November 680 Constantine convened the Sixth Ecumenical Council (also known as the Third Council of Constantinople).  Constantine presided in person during the formal aspects of the proceedings (the first eleven sittings and then the eighteenth), surrounded by his court officials, but he took no active role in the theological discussions. The Council reaffirmed the Orthodox doctrines of the Council of Chalcedon in 451.  This solved the controversy over monothelitism; conveniently for the Empire, most monothelites were now under the control of the Umayyad Caliphate. The council closed in September 681.

Due to the ongoing conflicts with the Arabs during the 670s, Constantine had been forced to conclude treaties in the west with the Lombards, who had captured Brindisi and Taranto. Also in 680, the Bulgars under Khan Asparukh crossed the Danube into nominally Imperial territory and began to subjugate the local communities and Slavic tribes. In 680, Constantine IV led a combined land and sea operation against the invaders and besieged their fortified camp in Dobruja. Suffering from bad health, the Emperor had to leave the army, which panicked and was defeated by the Bulgars. In 681, Constantine was forced to acknowledge the Bulgar state in Moesia and to pay tribute/protection money to avoid further inroads into Byzantine Thrace. Consequently, Constantine created the Theme of Thrace.

His brothers Heraclius and Tiberius had been crowned with him as augusti during the reign of their father, and this was confirmed by the demand of the populace, but in late 681 Constantine had them mutilated by slitting their noses so they would be considered ineligible to rule. Some argue that he then associated Justinian II to the throne, but all contemporary evidence indicates that he became emperor only after Constantine's death on 10 July 685.

Family
By his wife Anastasia, Constantine IV had at least two sons:
 Justinian II in 669, who succeeded him as emperor at the age of sixteen.
 Heraclius  670, known only from an episode in which his father sent locks of his and his brother's hair to Pope Benedict II.

In art and popular culture
 Constantine IV was portrayed by Iossif Surchadzhiev in the 1981 Bulgarian movie Aszparuh, directed by Ludmil Staikov.
 Constantine IV is the subject of the song "Imperator" ("Emperor"), released by the Bulgarian heavy metal band Epizod in their 2012 album Moyata molitva ("My prayer").

Notes

References

Sources

Primary sources

Secondary sources
 
  (Archive)

 
 
  (Archive)

See also

List of Byzantine emperors

External links

7th-century Byzantine emperors
7th-century Christian saints
Heraclian dynasty
Byzantine people of the Arab–Byzantine wars
Byzantine people of the Byzantine–Bulgarian Wars
685 deaths
Deaths from dysentery
Porphyrogennetoi
660s in the Byzantine Empire
670s in the Byzantine Empire
680s in the Byzantine Empire
Burials at the Church of the Holy Apostles
Sons of Byzantine emperors